Thomas Jacob Freeman (born November 5, 1980) is an American hammer thrower.  He competed at the 2009 World Outdoor championships.

A native of East Greenwich, Rhode Island, Freeman attended Bishop Hendricken High School.    He was Track and Field News "High School Athlete of the Year" in 2000.

In 2011, Freeman was suspended by the USA Track & Field due a positive test for tetrahydrocannabinol. It was Freeman's second doping violation, having previously tested positive for tetrahydrocannabinol in 2009.

References

External links

USATF profile for Jake Freeman
Manhattan Jaspers bio

1980 births
Living people
Bishop Hendricken High School alumni
American male hammer throwers
Track and field athletes from Cincinnati
Male weight throwers
Doping cases in athletics
American sportspeople in doping cases
USA Outdoor Track and Field Championships winners
USA Indoor Track and Field Championships winners
21st-century American people